"Pinewood Derby" is the sixth episode of the thirteenth season of the American animated television series South Park. The 187th overall episode of the series, it originally aired on Comedy Central in the United States on April 15, 2009 and in the United Kingdom on April 17, 2009. In the episode, Randy helps Stan cheat in a pinewood derby race, which inadvertently leads to the discovery of alien life. When an alien gangster visits South Park and the residents come into possession of his stolen "space cash", they decide to keep it for themselves and hide it from alien police officers who are looking for it.

The episode was written and directed by series co-founder Trey Parker, and was rated TV-MA L in the United States for strong to extreme language. "Pinewood Derby" was seen by 2.78 million households in its original broadcast, according to Nielsen ratings, making it the second most-watched episode on Comedy Central the week it aired. The episode received mixed reviews upon its initial broadcast.

"Pinewood Derby" has been noted for spoofing a number of world leaders, such as Gordon Brown, Silvio Berlusconi, Vladimir Putin, Luiz Inácio Lula da Silva, Raila Odinga, Taro Aso, Han Seung-soo, Nicolas Sarkozy, Matti Vanhanen, Angela Merkel, Wen Jiabao and John Howard. The episode was originally scheduled to air on MTV Latin America in February 2010 but was pulled at the last minute, allegedly due to its perceived negative portrayal of Mexican President Felipe Calderón.

Plot
Randy Marsh, determined to make sure his son Stan wins the annual statewide pinewood derby and beat Mr. Hollis, slips an object into the back of the car to give it an advantage. Stan learns from a news report that the object is a superconducting magnet, stolen from the Large Hadron Collider by Randy disguised as Princess Leia. During the finals, Randy coaxes Stan to lie to the judges and say he used only the parts in the approved pinewood derby kit. Stan wins first place when his car reaches warp speed, shooting off the track and into space, where it is later found by an alien species. Mr. Hollis commits suicide shortly after. Later, a spaceship lands in South Park, but its pilot is a bank robber named "Baby Fark McGee-zax" who demands that Stan and Randy build him a new warp drive while holding the entire planet at gunpoint. Everyone believes Stan and his father can create the drive using only the approved pinewood derby kit.

Stan tries to persuade Randy to tell the truth about the stolen magnet, but Randy refuses in order to avoid embarrassment. As the pair works on the warp drive, an Intergalactic Police ship approaches Earth; McGeezax cloaks his ship and drags Stan out of sight as a hostage, leaving the townspeople to divert the officers' questions. The officers say that McGeezax stole a large sum of space cash, but no one admits to seeing him, and the officers leave. Randy then provides a diversion for McGeezax while Stan, at Randy's insistence, stabs him to death with a shank. McGeezax's ship is found to contain the stolen space cash, but instead of returning it, Randy persuades everyone to divide it among themselves. Randy, in contact with all world leaders, buys other countries' silence by giving them a share. Four days later, the officers return to South Park. They now know that McGeezax landed here and Randy tells them of his death, but everyone denies finding any space cash.

Randy tries to keep other countries from spending the space cash since that might alert the Intergalactic Police; however, this fails when Mexico spends its money on 32 hospitals and 7 water parks, and China spends it on 48 soccer stadiums. Learning that Finland is about to divulge to the cops, Randy persuades the rest of the world to wipe Finland out in a nuclear missile attack. The Intergalactic Police pay a third visit to ask about the strike, but the South Park residents fake disbelief. By this time, Stan has had enough of the deception, so he tells the truth about cheating in the pinewood derby and returns his trophy; however, no one else on the planet comes clean about the space cash. McGeezax emerges from the officers' ship, having only faked his death. He reveals that he is really Kevern Zaksor, ambassador to new world testing, and that the entire chain of events was a test to see if Earth was worthy of joining the intergalactic community, but humans proved to be too selfish, greedy, chaotic and deceitful. As punishment for failing, the Earth and the Moon are isolated from the rest of the Universe via a cube-shaped forcefield. The episode ends with Randy saying, "Well that sucks."

Production
"Pinewood Derby" was written and directed by series co-creator Trey Parker. The episode first aired on April 15, 2009, in the United States, and was rated TV-MA L in the United States. The theme of the episode was a warning about the dangers of greed, lying, and cheating.

Cultural references

Among the world leaders who communicate with Randy in the episode are French president Nicolas Sarkozy, Chancellor of Germany Angela Merkel, Brazilian president Luiz Inácio Lula da Silva, Prime Minister of Italy Silvio Berlusconi, Chinese president Hu Jintao, Japanese prime minister Taro Aso, Mexican president Felipe Calderón, and Finnish prime minister Matti Vanhanen. The episode received some degree of criticism overseas for depicting the wrong leaders for its countries. The episode featured John Howard as Prime Minister of Australia,  even though he had been replaced by Kevin Rudd almost eighteen months earlier; according to the Macquarie National News, the episode "has copped some flack on video sharing websites" over the error. The episode also features Vladimir Putin as President of Russia, even though he stepped down in May 2008. The episode also featured Prime Minister of the United Kingdom Gordon Brown.

Reception
In its original American broadcast, "Pinewood Derby" was watched by 2.78 million overall households, according to the Nielsen ratings, making it the second most-watched Comedy Central production of the week, behind the Ron White stand-up special "Behavioral Problems", which was seen by 3.36 million households.

The episode received mixed to negative reviews. Josh Modell of The A.V. Club said the episode was "boring" and "unfunny", and was particularly disappointing following the episode "Fishsticks" the previous week. Modell said, "South Park episodes don't get much lazier or uninspired than this one. It was like half an idea stretched out forever and ever, and with very little payoff." Carlos Delgado of If Magazine said the episode plot was too silly and lacked laughs: "All in all, I was left feeling a little cheated. "Pinewood Derby" wasn't funny, it was just weird." Ken Tucker of Entertainment Weekly said the episode was told with "the warp-speed storytelling style that is making this season one of South Park's best". Travis Fickett of IGN said he was happy to see an episode centered on Randy Marsh, who he said is an excellent character; Fickett said of "Pinewood Derby", "This isn't a great episode but its fast-paced lunacy in the South Park tradition and most of the genre tropes it riffs on are dead on."

Mexican flag controversy
"Pinewood Derby" drew considerable media attention in Mexico when it originally aired due to its depiction of Mexican president Felipe Calderón. The episode was scheduled to air in Spanish on MTV Latin America on February 8, 2010, and was advertised extensively for one week prior to the broadcast date. However, a few hours before the scheduled time, the network decided not to air the episode and replaced it with the episode "The Ring", allegedly due to its depiction of Calderón irritating the international community and frivolously spending the space cash on water parks. This depiction was said to differ from the image Mexico's Ministry of the Interior sought to present of Calderón, whom they dubbed the "Employment president". MTV said the South Park creators did not get a special permit needed to broadcast an image of Mexico's flag, and MTV executives said they did not want to risk angering fans by altering the image. The explanation was met with skepticism by Mexican South Park fans, some of whom accused MTV of unfair censorship. MTV later announced it would broadcast the episode on April 4 after the network was granted permission from the Minister of the Interior to air it. When asked to comment on the episode getting pulled, Stone said, "That's so far away from us. We read that on the news, too, along with everyone else."

Home media
"Pinewood Derby", along with the thirteen other episodes from South Park thirteenth season, were released on a three-disc DVD set and two-disc Blu-ray set in the United States on March 16, 2010. The sets included brief audio commentaries by Parker and Stone for each episode, a collection of deleted scenes, and a special mini-feature Inside Xbox: A Behind-the-Scenes Tour of South Park Studios, which discussed the process behind animating the show with Inside Xbox host Major Nelson.

References

External links

 "Pinewood Derby" Full episode at South Park Studios
 

Television episodes about alien visitations
Cultural depictions of Gordon Brown
Cultural depictions of Vladimir Putin
Cultural depictions of Angela Merkel
Cultural depictions of Silvio Berlusconi
Scouting in popular culture
South Park (season 13) episodes
Television episodes about suicide
Animation controversies in television
Television controversies
Censorship in South America
Television controversies in Mexico